BGS National Public School is a CBSE affiliated school located in the Hulimavu suburb of Bangalore.

Recognition
Education Today ranked BGS National Public School as the top CBSE school in Bangalore and second highest in India, after Kothari International School.  The academic director, S. A. Nair, has also received recognition.

References

Private schools in Bangalore
2006 establishments in Karnataka